Kaali is a village in Saaremaa Parish, Saare County in western Estonia,  from Kuressaare, the island capital. Valjala, to the north-east, is the nearest town.

Kaali crater

The village is the site of the Kaali crater, actually a series of craters formed by meteorite impacts more than 4,000 years ago. The main crater has become well-known and is now a popular tourist destination. Supporting a museum, cafeteria, shop, and hotel, the crater has led to tourism becoming an important part of Kaali's economy.

Facilities
The village is served by a community school. Other local facilities are mostly associated with the tourist destination at the crater, including a cafeteria and hotel.

Before the administrative reform in 2017, the village was in Pihtla Parish.

References 

Villages in Saare County